This is a list of Canadian television related events from 1990.

Events

Debuts

Ending this year

Television shows

1950s
Country Canada (1954–2007)
Hockey Night in Canada (1952–present)
The National (1954–present)
Front Page Challenge (1957–1995)

1960s
CTV National News (1961–present)
Land and Sea (1964–present)
Man Alive (1967–2000)
Mr. Dressup (1967–1996)
The Nature of Things (1960–present, scientific documentary series)
Question Period (1967–present, news program)
The Tommy Hunter Show (1965–1992)
W-FIVE (1966–present, newsmagazine program)

1970s
Canada AM (1972–present, news program)
the fifth estate (1975–present, newsmagazine program)
Marketplace (1972–present, newsmagazine program)
100 Huntley Street (1977–present, religious program)

1980s
Adrienne Clarkson Presents (1988–1999)
Beetlejuice the animated series (1989-1991)
CityLine (1987–present, news program)
CODCO (1987–1993)
The Comedy Mill (1986–1991)
Degrassi High (1989–1991)
Fashion File (1989–2009)
Fred Penner's Place (1985–1997)
Good Rockin' Tonite (1989–1992)
Katts and Dog (1988–1993)
The Kids in the Hall (1989–1994)
The Journal (1982–1992)
Just For Laughs (1988–present)
Midday (1985–2000)
My Secret Identity (1988–1991)
On the Road Again (1987–2007)
The Raccoons (1985–1992)
Road to Avonlea (1989–1996)
Street Legal (1987–1994)
Super Dave (1987–1991)
Talk About (1988-1990)
Under the Umbrella Tree (1986–1993)
Venture (1985–2007)
Video Hits (1984–1993)

TV movies
Divided Loyalties
Getting Married in Buffalo Jump
The Little Kidnappers
The Mills of Power (Les Tisserands du pouvoir) - English version

Television stations

Network affiliation changes

See also
 1990 in Canada
 List of Canadian films of 1990

References